The 2019–20 UNC Greensboro men's basketball team represented the University of North Carolina at Greensboro during the 2019–20 NCAA Division I men's basketball season. The Spartans, led by ninth-year head coach Wes Miller, played most of their home games at Greensboro Coliseum Complex in Greensboro, North Carolina, with a handful of games at Fleming Gymnasium, on the UNCG campus. They are members of the Southern Conference (SoCon). They finished the season 23–9, 13–5 in SoCon play to finish in third place. They lost in the quarterfinals of SoCon tournament to Chattanooga. Although being a good postseason candidate with 23 wins, all postseason tournaments were cancelled amid the COVID-19 pandemic.

Previous season 
The Spartans finished the 2018–19 season 29–7, 15–3 in SoCon play to finish second place. They lost in the finals of the SoCon tournament to Wofford. They received a bid to the NIT where they lost in the elite eight to Lipscomb. Guards Francis Alonso and Isaiah Miller were named to the All-Southern Conference first-team. Isaiah Miller was also named the Southern Conference Defensive Player of the Year.

Roster

Schedule and results 

|-
!colspan=9 style=| Regular season 

|-

|-
!colspan=9 style=| SoCon tournament

References

UNC Greensboro Spartans men's basketball seasons
UNC Greensboro
UNC Greensboro Spartans men's basketball
UNC Greensboro Spartans men's basketball